Reggie Ford may refer to:
 Reggie Ford (cricketer)
 Reggie Ford (boxer)

See also
 Reginald Ford, New Zealand explorer, land agent and architect